Glenn Charles W. Kirkham (born 8 October 1982) is an English field hockey player who played for the English and British national team.

Hockey
Kirkham made his international senior debut for the national squad in January 2002 in a match against Poland. He was named as the England captain for 2006–07. He was part of the England team that participated in the field hockey world cup in Monchengladbach, Germany where they finished 5th overall. He also competed in the 2009 European championships in Amsterdam where England were champions. He was part of the England squad in Delhi, India at the Hero Honda World Cup that lost only one group game against Spain, putting them through to the semi-finals.

Kirkham represented Great Britain at the 2008 Olympics in Beijing and the 2012 Olympics in London, where the team finished in 4th place. He retired from international hockey in 2013.

Personal life
Kirkham (nicknamed Glenda) started field hockey at the small club of Alford from a young age, where he moved on to Long Sutton. He was educated at Queen Elizabeth's Grammar School, Alford, and then achieved a BSc in Sports Science at Loughborough University.

He used to play football for the youth team of Scunthorpe United FC where he played in the junior FA Cup. He has also been an above average cricket player in his time, representing Alford & District Cricket Club in the Lincolnshire Premier League.

He lives in Hoddesdon. He was sports coach and form tutor at The Perse School but now is at New Hall School in Chelmsford and is Director of Coaching at Chelmsford Hockey Club.

He has played club hockey for East Grinstead, Loughborough and Long Sutton.
He coaches sport at the Perse school, Cambridge

References

External links
 
 
 

1982 births
English male field hockey players
Living people
Field hockey players at the 2006 Commonwealth Games
2006 Men's Hockey World Cup players
Field hockey players at the 2008 Summer Olympics
2010 Men's Hockey World Cup players
Field hockey players at the 2012 Summer Olympics
Olympic field hockey players of Great Britain
British male field hockey players
Sportspeople from Grimsby
People from Hoddesdon
Alumni of Loughborough University
Loughborough Students field hockey players
East Grinstead Hockey Club players
People educated at Queen Elizabeth's Grammar School, Alford
Commonwealth Games competitors for England